The Great Kite was a wooden machine designed by Leonardo da Vinci. Leonardo realized it between the end of  the 15th Century and the beginning of the 16th Century. Drawings of parts and components of this machine can be found in the Codex on the flight of birds, which however lacks the overall description of the machine itself. Some drawings within the same codex suggest that it was created in similarity with flapping flight. However, this was hardly possible to perform given the available technologies, thus Leonardo developed a machine for mainly a gliding flight. The machine is named after the animal from which Leonardo took inspiration to realize the flying machine, the Kite.

See also 
 Science and inventions of Leonardo da Vinci

Note 

Leonardo da Vinci projects